Seidman may refer to:

 Seidman (surname), list of people with this name
 BDO Seidman, an American accounting firm
 Seidman College of Business, a college at Grand Valley State University
 Anglicized version of seiðmaðr, a male practitioner of Seid